Epidola barcinonella is a moth of the family Gelechiidae. It was described by Pierre Millière in 1867. It is found in Spain, France, Greece and on Sicily.

References

Moths described in 1867
Epidola